Devilstone Open Air (aka "Velnio Akmuo" in Lithuanian) is a summer open air rock and metal music festival. It takes place annually since 2009 in the town of Anykščiai, in Lithuania. Devilstone Open Air has included performers playing black metal, death metal, power metal, thrash metal, sludge metal, doom metal, post rock, stoner rock, and progressive rock music genres. Music bands from Europe, North and South America, and Australia have performed in the festival. Devilstone Open Air is usually held in the mid-summer, around the third weekend of July.

Other activities
Next to live music performances, Devilstone Open Air has workshops, masterclasses,  a club night called Rocktheque, sports tournaments, and other activities. The festival owns the rights to a one-of-a-kind growling/screaming/grunting competition MC Growl.

Controversy
In 2009 Lithuanian Association of Exorcist labeled the band Sepultura, who were announced to play at the festival, as ‘satanic’ based on their lyrics. Local church spoke against the festival’s choice of title. In 2010 Mayhem performed at the festival. After their performance, the local priest collected photographic evidence and went to the Ministry of Justice with a request to investigate the band's performance. The priest supported by a group of believers claimed that “Norwegian band Mayhem, that took part in the festival, incited religious hatred.” In 2011 the band Ondskapt performed at the festival. During the performance the band member Kim stepped out naked onto the stage creating a resonance within the society. In 2012 six Lithuanian towns held religious adorations for the festival’s audience  and a faithful congregation prayed next to the festival gates.

Line-up history

In 2009-2013 festival also had a very small stage titled MetalClinic dedicated for music improvisations, competitions, surprise performances, Masterclasses, workshops, MC Growl fights. Anyone capable and willing to play a music instrument can use this stage for performance.

Picture gallery

References

External links
  Official website

Music festivals in Lithuania
2009 establishments in Lithuania
Rock festivals in Lithuania
Heavy metal festivals in Lithuania
Anykščiai
Summer events in Lithuania